The Monastery's Hunter (German: Der Klosterjäger) is a 1920 German silent historical drama film directed by Franz Osten and starring Fritz Greiner, Thea Steinbrecher and Toni Wittels. It is based on the 1892 novel of the same title by Ludwig Ganghofer.

Cast
 Fritz Greiner as Wolfrat Polzer  
 Thea Steinbrecher as Gittli  
 Toni Wittels as Sepha  
 Carl Dalmonico as Probst Heinrich von Inzing  
 Viktor Gehring as Klosterjäger Haymo  
 F.W. Schröder-Schrom as Pater Desertus - Graf Dietwald  
 Hans Außfelder as Klostervogt  
 Curt Gerdes as Der Eggebauer  
 Hildegard Wall as Zenza  
 Stuart Josef Lutz as Bildschnitzer Ulei  
 Ferdinand Martini as Klostergärtner Frater Severin  
 Molly Albrecht as Klosterbub Walti

See also
 The Monastery's Hunter (1935)
 The Monastery's Hunter (1953)

References

Bibliography
 Bock, Hans-Michael & Bergfelder, Tim. The Concise Cinegraph: Encyclopaedia of German Cinema. Berghahn Books, 2009.

External links

German historical drama films
1920s historical drama films
1920 films
Films of the Weimar Republic
German silent feature films
Films directed by Franz Osten
Films based on German novels
Films based on works by Ludwig Ganghofer
Films about hunters
Films set in Bavaria
Films set in the Alps
Films set in the 14th century
German black-and-white films
1920 drama films
Silent historical drama films
1920s German films
1920s German-language films